Athletics (Spanish: Atletismo), for the 2013 Bolivarian Games, took place from 26 to 30 November 2013. A detailed report for the IAAF was given by Eduardo Biscayart.

Medal summary

Men

Track

Field

Women

Track

Field

Medal table
Key:

Participation
According to an unofficial count, 305 athletes from 11 countries participated.

 (27)
 (24)
 (55)
 (2)
 (43)
 (1)
 (14)
 Panamá (9)
 (7)
 Perú (69)
 (54)

References

International athletics competitions hosted by Peru
Bolivarian Games
Events at the 2013 Bolivarian Games
Athletics at the Bolivarian Games
Bolivarian Games